Dented Records is a record label headquartered in the United Kingdom, and best known as the home to critically acclaimed hip-hop act Foreign Beggars and Focused Few.

Dented Records record label was established in 2003 by Foreign Beggars as a vehicle to release their own material. The label saw the release of their first single "Where did the Sun Go" ft. Dark Circle (Jazz Fudge) and Tommy Evans establish the name and the brand. Foreign Beggars soon released their second single "Seasons Beatings" featuring Task Force and their debut album "Asylum Speakers" featured prominent UK rappers and several international artists, and was quoted by DJ Magazine as the Best Unsung UK Hip Hop album of all time.

Artists 
 Foreign Beggars
 Dubbledge
 Stig of the Dump
 Dr. Syntax
 Medison
 Ed Skrein

See also
 List of record labels

References

External links
Dented Records website
Dented Records at Discogs

Record labels established in 2001
British record labels
Hip hop record labels